Continental Type Founders Association was founded by Melbert Brinckerhoff Cary Jr. in 1925 to distribute foundry type imported from European foundries.  The influence of more modern European type design was thus felt in the United States for the first time, and American foundries responded by imitating many of the more popular faces.  A.T.F.'s Paramount and Monotype's Sans Serif series are two examples of this.

Foundries represented
The following foundries were represented:

Beginning in 1927 Continental also distributed faces cast by Frederic Goudy, and two faces for Doug McMurtrie.  At first Goudy's type was cast at his own  Village Letter Foundry, but after 1929 these were cast by the New England Foundry.  Despite imports being virtually cut-off during the war years, Continental was still issuing Goudy's types as late as 1944 and may have continued functioning even later.

References
 Specimen Book of Continental Types, Continental Type Founders Association, N.Y.C., 1929.
 MacGrew, Mac, American Metal Typefaces of the Twentieth Century, Oak Knoll Books, New Castle Delaware, 1993, .
 ‘‘‘Heller, Steven, Philip B. Meggs, Texts on type: critical writings on typography, Allworth Press, N.Y.C., 2001.

Letterpress font foundries of the United States
Design companies established in 1925
Defunct companies based in New York City
1925 establishments in New York (state)